is a railway station in the town of Kawanishi, Yamagata Prefecture, Japan, operated by East Japan Railway Company (JR East).

Lines
Uzen-Komtasu Station is served by the Yonesaka Line, and is located 16.9 rail kilometers from the terminus of the line at Yonezawa Station.

Station layout
The station has two opposed side platforms connected by a footbridge. The station is staffed.

Platforms

History
Uzen-Komatsu Station opened on September 28, 1926. The station was absorbed into the JR East network upon the privatization of JNR on 1 April 1987. A new station building was completed in February 2002.

Passenger statistics
In fiscal 2018, the station was used by an average of 290 passengers daily (boarding passengers only).

Surrounding area

 Kawanishi Dahlia Park
 Kawanishi-machi Friendly Plaza

See also
List of Railway Stations in Japan

References

External links

 JR East Station information 

Railway stations in Yamagata Prefecture
Yonesaka Line
Railway stations in Japan opened in 1926
Stations of East Japan Railway Company
Kawanishi, Yamagata